Huevos (Spanish: Eggs) is an island in the Republic of Trinidad and Tobago.  The island is 1.01 km2 (253 acres) in area.  It is one of the "Bocas Islands", which lie in the Bocas del Dragón (Dragons' Mouth) between Trinidad and Venezuela.

Flora
Vegetation of the island includes Yellow Poui, Hog Plum, Naked Indian, and Salt-fish Wood.

Fauna
A number of terrestrial reptiles have been recorded on Huevos, including the Green Iguana (Iguana iguana), Anolis chrysolepis,  the Rainbow Whiptail Lizard (Cnemidophorus lemniscatus), the Turnip-tailed Gecko (Thecadactylus rapicauda), the Variegated Gecko Gonatodes ceciliae, the Rusty Trinidad Gecko (Gonatodes cf ferrugineus), Wiegmann's Striped Gecko (Gonatodes vittatus), Mole's Gecko Sphaerodactylus molei, and Boddarts Tropical Racer snake Mastigodryas boddaerti. Additionally, the marine Hawksbill Turtle has been recorded to nest on the sandy beach at Tortue Bay on Huevos Island (the bay's name derived from these visiting turtles, and the island's name derived from their eggs). 

Several species of birds visit and some nest on Huevos.

Places

Places at Huevos - Cape Garlio, Raya Del Caribe, Parasol (Umbrella) Rocks, Tortue Bay, Balata Bay, Point Braba

Parasol Rocks
The Parasol Rocks, also known as the Umbrella Rocks, are a series of small rock formations located less than 50 metres to the east of Huevos. On 10 August 1800 a fifth-rate Royal Navy ship, HMS Dromedary was wrecked on the rocks with 500 passengers. All passengers and crew were rescued.

See also
 List of islands of Trinidad and Tobago

References

Islands of Trinidad and Tobago
Gulf of Paria